Dysphania melanocarpa, commonly known as black crumbweed, is an annual herb that grows in arid and semi-arid regions of Australia.

Description 
It grows as a prostrate aromatic annual, with hairy stems that branch from its base. Leaves are oval in shape, about fifteen millimetres long. Flowers occur in dense clusters located in the axils.

Taxonomy 
It was first published in 1922 by John McConnell Black, as a variety of C. carinatum, and promoted to species rank by him in 1934. Two forms have been published, although these are only recognised in South Australia and Western Australia; they are C. melanocarpum f. melanocarpum and C. melanocarpum f. leucocarpum. In 2008, Sergei L. Mosyakin & Steven E. Clemants grouped this taxon in genus Dysphania.

Distribution and habitat 
It occurs in arid and semi-arid areas of Australia, usually in well-drained soils.

References

External links 

 

melanocarpa
Flora of New South Wales
Flora of the Northern Territory
Flora of South Australia
Eudicots of Western Australia
Caryophyllales of Australia